"Can't Even Get the Blues" is a song written by Tom Damphier and Rick Carnes, and recorded by American country music artist Reba McEntire.  It was released in September 1982 as the second single from the album Unlimited.  The song was McEntire's fourteenth country hit and her first number one country hit.  The single went to number one for one week and spent a total of fourteen weeks on the country chart.

She performed the song on the 1982 Country Music Association Awards (CMA Awards).

Charts

References

1982 songs
Reba McEntire songs
1982 singles
Song recordings produced by Jerry Kennedy
Mercury Records singles